The PFL 9 mixed martial arts event for the 2019 season of the Professional Fighters League was held on October 31, 2019, at the Mandalay Bay Events Center in Las Vegas, Nevada.

Background
The event was the ninth of the 2019 season and marked the start of the playoffs for the Heavyweight and Light Heavyweight divisions.

Results

2019 PFL Heavyweight playoffs

2019 PFL Light Heavyweight playoffs

See also
List of PFL events
List of current PFL fighters

References

Professional Fighters League
2019 in mixed martial arts
Mixed martial arts in Las Vegas
Sports competitions in Las Vegas
2019 in sports in Nevada
October 2019 sports events in the United States